Pleasantly Perfect (April 2, 1998 – June 3, 2020) was a Thoroughbred racehorse who retired as the fourth-richest American horse in career earnings.

Background
Pleasantly Perfect was sired by Pleasant Colony, winner of the 1981 Kentucky Derby and Preakness Stakes. His dam Regal State, who was sired by the 1978 Triple Crown winner Affirmed, won the 1985 Group One Prix Morny in France.

Racing career
Pleasantly Perfect started his career on August 25, 2002 with a fourth place finish in the Pacific Classic Stakes.

2003
In 2003, he started the year by coming third in the San Antonio Stakes on February 2 and fourth in the Santa Anita Handicap on March 1.

At the end of the year, Pleasantly Perfect won the 6 million dollar Breeders' Cup Classic on October 25.

2004
Pleasantly Perfect then won another big race, the 12 million dollar Dubai World Cup on March 27.

He then came second in the San Diego Handicap on August 1, before winning the Pacific Classic Stakes on August 22.

In his last race he finished third behind Ghostzapper and Roses in May in the 2004 Breeders' Cup Classic on October 30.

Stud record
Pleasantly Perfect entered stud in 2005 at Lane's End Farm in Versailles, Kentucky. His first offspring to race was Rapid Redux, who won a record 22 straight races and was the winner of the Eclipse Special Award for 2011. Pleasantly Perfect was exported to Turkey where he died on June 3, 2020 at the age of 22. His most successful son, Whitmore, won the Breeders' Cup Sprint a few months later in November 2020.

References

 Pleasantly Perfect's pedigree and racing stats
 Video at YouTube of Pleasantly Perfect's win in the 2004 Dubai World Cup

External links
 "On the Muscle" documentary features Pleasantly Perfect

1998 racehorse births
Racehorses bred in Kentucky
Racehorses trained in the United States
Breeders' Cup Classic winners
Dubai World Cup winners
Thoroughbred family 16-a
2020 racehorse deaths